Chinquapin Mountain is a summit in the U.S. state of Oregon.

Chinquapin Mountain was named for the Chinquapin trees in the area.

References

Mountains of Jackson County, Oregon
Mountains of Oregon